Woo Bih Li  is a Singaporean judge of the Supreme Court.

Woo received his Bachelor of Laws from the University of Singapore in 1977, and was admitted as an advocate and solicitor of the Supreme Court the following year. He joined the Singaporean law firm Allen & Gledhill in 1970 and in 1992, he established Bih Li & Lee in 1992, becoming its Managing Partner. Having been appointed Senior Counsel in 1997, he was appointed Judicial Commissioner in May 2000, and Judge of the Supreme Court in January 2003.

References

External links
Supreme Court of Singapore website

1954 births
Living people
Anglo-Chinese School alumni
Judges of the Supreme Court of Singapore
National University of Singapore alumni
Singaporean Christians
Singaporean people of Chinese descent
Singaporean Senior Counsel